Fenerty is a surname. Notable people with the surname include:

Gill Fenerty (born 1963), player of Canadian football
Clare G. Fenerty (1895–1952), was a Republican member of the United States House of Representatives for Pennsylvania
Charles Fenerty ( 1821–1892), was a Canadian inventor